The Sand Princess is a 2019 Thai television series starring Pimchanok Luevisadpaibul (Baifern), Worrawech Danuwong (Dan) and Chutavuth Pattarakampol (March).

Produced by GMMTV together with On & On Infinity, the series was one of the thirteen television series for 2019 launched by GMMTV in their "Wonder Th13teen" event on 5 November 2018. It premiered on GMM 25 and LINE TV on 24 August 2019, airing on Saturdays and Sundays at 21:25 ICT and 23:00 ICT, respectively. The series concluded on 6 October 2019.

Cast and characters 
Below are the cast of the series:

Main 
 Pimchanok Luevisadpaibul (Baifern) as Kodnipa/"Kod"
 Worrawech Danuwong (Dan) as Kirakorn/"Ki"
 Chutavuth Pattarakampol (March) as Jirapat/"Ji"

Supporting 
 Weerayut Chansook (Arm) as Wanchot/"Chot"
 Alysaya Tsoi (Alice) as Meaw
 Maneerat Kam-Uan (Ae) as Puang Petch, Ji's secretary
 Leo Saussay as Jae
 Korn Khunatipapisiri (Oaujun) as Chon
 Duangta Tungkamani as Khunying Krongthong
 Virahya Pattarachokchai (Gina) as Aff
 Trin Settachoke
 Narumon Phongsupan as Ladda

Guest role 
 Supoj Janjareonborn (Lift) as Ji and Ki's father
 Jirakit Thawornwong (Mek) as Boom

Soundtracks

References

External links 
 The Sand Princess on GMM 25 website 
 The Sand Princess on LINE TV
 GMMTV

Television series by GMMTV
Thai romantic comedy television series
Thai drama television series
2019 Thai television series debuts
2019 Thai television series endings
GMM 25 original programming